Rugathodes aurantius is a species of cobweb spider in the family Theridiidae. It is found in North America and Northern Russia.

References

Theridiidae
Articles created by Qbugbot
Spiders described in 1915